Kapuliyadda is a village in Sri Lanka. It is located in Pathahewaheta Divisional Secretariat in Kandy District within Central Province.

See also
List of towns in Central Province, Sri Lanka

External links

Populated places in Kandy District